{{DISPLAYTITLE:NAD(P)+ transhydrogenase (Si-specific)}}

In biochemistry, NAD(P)+ transhydrogenase (Si-specific) is an enzyme that catalyzes the chemical reaction

NADPH + NAD+  NADP+ + NADH

Thus, the two substrates of this enzyme are NADPH and NAD+, whereas its two products are NADP+ and NADH. This enzyme participates in nicotinate and nicotinamide metabolism.  It employs one cofactor, FAD.

Physiological function 

Si-specific transhydrogenase is a soluble protein found in some Gammaproteobacteria and gram-positive bacteria. Enterobacteriaceae are known to possess both a soluble and a membrane-bound transhydrogenase. In living cells this enzyme primarily operates in the direction consuming NADPH and producing NADH, as the physiological ratio of NADPH/NADP+ is much higher than the ratio of NADH/NAD+. Its chief function in vivo is the reoxidization of excess NADPH.

Nomenclature 

This enzyme belongs to the family of oxidoreductases, specifically those acting on NADH or NADPH with NAD+ or NADP+ as acceptor.  The systematic name of this enzyme is NADPH:NAD+ oxidoreductase (Si-specific). Other names in common use include non-energy-linked transhydrogenase, NAD(P)+ transhydrogenase (B-specific), and soluble transhydrogenase.

Older literature often uses ambiguous names such as pyridine nucleotide transhydrogenase, transhydrogenase, NAD(P)+ transhydrogenase, nicotinamide nucleotide transhydrogenase, NADPH-NAD+ transhydrogenase, pyridine nucleotide transferase, or NADPH-NAD+ oxidoreductase, which can equally apply to the more common NAD(P)+ transhydrogenase (Re/Si-specific).

References

Further reading 

 

EC 1.6.1
NADPH-dependent enzymes
NADH-dependent enzymes
Flavoproteins
Enzymes of known structure